The Sunset Trail is the name of several films.

 The Sunset Trail (1917 film), an American silent drama
 The Sunset Trail (1924 film), an American silent western
 The Sunset Trail (1932 film), an American western
 Sunset Trail, an American western from 1939